The 1970 World Men's Handball Championship was the seventh team handball World Championship. It was held in France between 26 February-8 March 1970. Romania won the championship.

Qualification

1First Canada was qualified but was disqualified because they used a Danish player.

Results

Preliminary round

GROUP A

GROUP B

GROUP C

GROUP D

Placement Round (9-12 pos.)
The four third placed teams from the preliminary round played a round robin tournament for positions 9-12.

Main Round
The top two finishers from each preliminary round group progressed to the quarter-finals. The winners progressed to the semi-final stage, while losers played for positions 5-8.

Quarter-finals

Semi-finals

Bronze medal game

Final

Positions 5-8

Semi-Final Round

7-8 pos.

5-6 pos.

Source: International Handball Federation

Final standings

Places 1–8 were decided by play–off or knock–out. Places 9–12 were decide by a placement round. Teams finishing fourth in the preliminary round are ranked 13 to 16. In case of a tie in points gained, the goal difference of the preliminary round were taken into account.

World Handball Championship tournaments
World Men's Handball Championship
H
World Men's Championship
World Men's Handball Championship
World Men's Handball Championship